The 1997 Minnesota Golden Gophers football team represented the University of Minnesota in the 1997 Big Ten Conference football season. In their first year under head coach Glen Mason, the Golden Gophers compiled a 3–9 record and were outscored by their opponents by a combined total of 340 to 236.

Defensive end Lamanzer Williams was named an All-American by the College Football Writers Association and the Football Writers Association of America.  Williams was also named All-Big Ten first team.  Wide receiver Tutu Atwell and strong safety Tyrone Carter were named All-Big Ten second team.  Linebacker Luke Braaten, cornerback Jason Hagman, placekicker Erin McManus, fullback Brad Prigge, long snapper Derek Rackley, quarterback Cory Sauter, defensive tackle Theron von Behren and linebacker Parc Williams were named Academic All-Big Ten.

Total attendance for the season was 269,385, which averaged out to 44,897 per game. The season high for attendance was against rival Wisconsin.

Schedule

Roster
WR Tutu Atwell
DB Tyrone Carter, Soph.

References

Minnesota
Minnesota Golden Gophers football seasons
Minnesota Golden Gophers football